This is a list of settlements in East Sussex by population based on the results of the 2011 census. The next United Kingdom census will take place in 2021. In 2011, there were 16 built-up area subdivisions with 5,000 or more inhabitants in East Sussex, shown in the table below.

Population ranking

See also 

 East Sussex

References

External links 
 ONS Census website

East Sussex
East Sussex-related lists
East Sussex